

All-time most appearances (minimum 200 games played)
Regular season only: 
(includes AAFC and AFL games)

If more than one position is listed for a player, the BOLD listing is his primary position. This list is sorted by 1) games played, 2) first year played, 3) last year played and 4) surname.

Updated through the 2022 regular season.

See also 
List of most consecutive starts and games played by National Football League players

References

Games played
Games played
National Football League lists